Euphorbia pirahazo is a species of plant in the family Euphorbiaceae. It is endemic to Madagascar.  Its natural habitat is subtropical or tropical dry forests. It is threatened by habitat loss.

More than 100 years ago this plant was over-collected for rubber production, but it has not been collected recently. It was thought to be nearly extinct by 1921. It is now "extremely rare if not extinct".

Sources

pirahazo
Endemic flora of Madagascar
Critically endangered flora of Africa
Taxonomy articles created by Polbot